Rosslyn Data Technologies (aka Rosslyn Analytics) is a software company providing procurement and master data management solutions. Its procurement portfolio includes software solutions for Spend Analytics, Supplier Information Management, Supplier Performance Management and Supplier Contract Management. Master Data Management solutions include Data Extraction, Data Cleansing and Data Enrichment; available via a cloud-based data platform.

The company is listed on AIM, a sub-market of the London Stock Exchange, and is headquartered in London with offices in New York City and Chicago, Illinois.

History
Rosslyn Analytics was founded in 2007 by Charles Clark and Hugh Cox. The company was named after Rosslyn Chapel in Midlothian, Scotland, which is famous for its mysterious carvings, believed to contain a message or even music that has never been verifiably decoded. In 2009, the company launched its first cloud-based business intelligence product - a self-service spend analytics app for its RAPid data platform. The RAPid platform won several awards for innovation and excellence, including the Technology Excellence Award for “Best New Product”.

In April 2011, as a public service to help the UK Government reduce the deficit by getting better control of its purchasing, Rosslyn Analytics offered to provide free spend analytics to the government in just 30 days. The government refused the offer.

In January 2012, Rosslyn Analytics entered the United States, establishing offices in New York City and Denver, Colorado.

Rosslyn Analytics was the first technology company to bring QlikView into the cloud in 2012.

In 2013, Rosslyn Analytics was featured in Gartner’s Magic Quadrant for Strategic Sourcing Application Suites.

In February 2014, the company filed its first patent with the UK Intellectual Property Office on machine-learning. In April, Rosslyn Analytics went public on AIM under the name of Rosslyn Data Technologies Group plc. In May 2014, Rosslyn Analytics joined the UK government’s G-Cloud 5 Framework for Software-as-a-Service (SaaS) providers.

Recognition 
In January 2011, JMP Securities recognized Rosslyn Analytics as one of its “Hot 100” software companies to watch.

In March 2013, Bessemer named Rosslyn Analytics as one of the top Business Intelligence / Analytics cloud companies.

In December 2015, Rosslyn Analytics was named a strong performer in the Forrester Research report, “The Forrester Wave™: Cloud Business Intelligence Platforms, Q4 2015.”

In May 2016, Rosslyn Analytics recognized as finalist for the 2016 Microsoft Data Platform Partner of the Year award 

In March 2017, Rosslyn Data Technologies was shortlisted for analytics product of the year in the UK Cloud Awards.

Products 
The company’s flagship product is its cloud-based data platform called RAPid.  RAPid provides self-service data integration, cleansing, enrichment, analysis and visualization capabilities via a single platform. Business users access the benefits of the platform via automated and manual self-service tools. The RAPid platform comes with a number of pre-built analytical apps sold as modular solutions such as spend analytics, people analytics, forensics analytics, expense analytics and supplier performance management.

Founders
Rosslyn Analytics was founded by Charles Clark and Hugh Cox, two former British Army officers. Charles has been recognized for his leadership by Supply & Demand Chain Executive, having been identified as a “Pro to Know” from 2010 to 2015. Hugh Cox is the company’s Chief Data Officer.

References

British companies established in 2007
Business intelligence companies
Business software companies
Companies listed on the Alternative Investment Market
Software companies based in London
Software companies established in 2007